The Muppets at Walt Disney World is a television special starring Jim Henson's Muppets at Walt Disney World in Lake Buena Vista, Florida. The special aired on NBC as part of The Magical World of Disney on May 6, 1990, and turned out to be the last Muppets special that Henson would work on (he would die ten days following its airing, on May 16).

Prelude
At the start of The Magical World of Disney, then-Disney CEO Michael Eisner talks about the special while having tea with Fozzie Bear and his mother Emily in the lobby of the Grand Floridian Beach Resort. After Fozzie accidentally gets butter on Eisner’s sleeve, Gonzo shows up with a group of Muppet monsters and Frackles to take care of the mess.

Plot

In this television special, the Muppets are visiting Kermit's family for their annual reunion where they meet up with Kermit's aunts and uncles. When the others learn that the swamp is right next to Walt Disney World, they sneak in, and are pursued by a security guard named Quentin Fitzwaller (played by Charles Grodin). Attractions and areas featured include Big Thunder Mountain, the Indiana Jones Epic Stunt Spectacular!, Star Tours, the Mad Tea Party, World Showcase, the Walt Disney World Monorail System and the utilidors. The special depicts the three parks (Magic Kingdom, Epcot and Disney-MGM Studios) as one connected area, despite the parks actually being apart from each other.

The story ends with the Muppets having a friendly meeting at Mickey Mouse's office where Mickey and Kermit compare their company's theme songs, "When You Wish Upon a Star" and "The Rainbow Connection" and the ideals behind them. After that, the Muppets return to the swamp, but find out about Miss Piggy remaining stuck in front of The Great Movie Ride with her feet in the cement. They return to Walt Disney World for her afterwards to free her. While stuck in the cement, Miss Piggy shouts for help as the credits roll.

Cast

Human cast
 Charles Grodin as Quentin Fitzwaller
 Raven-Symoné as Little Girl
 Michael Eisner as Himself

Voice cast

 Wayne Allwine as Mickey Mouse

Muppet performers
 Jim Henson as Kermit the Frog, Rowlf the Dog, Dr. Teeth, Link Hogthrob, the Swedish Chef, Waldorf
 Frank Oz as Miss Piggy, Fozzie Bear, Animal
 Jerry Nelson as Robin the Frog, Camilla the Chicken, Floyd Pepper, Emily Bear, Frog #1
 Richard Hunt as Scooter, Janice, Beaker, Statler, Frog #2
 Dave Goelz as Gonzo the Great, Dr. Bunsen Honeydew, Beauregard, Zoot, Frog #3
 Steve Whitmire as Rizzo the Rat, Bean Bunny, Lips, Frog #4
 Kevin Clash as Clifford, Alligator, Frog #5
 Camille Bonora as Frog #6, Additional Muppets
 David Rudman as Frog #7, Additional Muppets
 Additional Muppets performed by Rickey Boyd, Rick Lyon, Jim Martin and Joey Mazzarino

Other characters' appearances
During the song "Rockin' All Around the World" (in melody of Status Quo's "Rockin' All Over the World"), Muppets inspired by the Audio-Animatronic dolls from the "It's a Small World" attraction appear.

Costumed characters from Snow White and the Seven Dwarfs (1937), Brer Bear from Song of the South (1946), Bongo and Lulubelle from Fun and Fancy Free (1947), and the Country Bear Jamboree attraction have cameos.

Songs
 "Knee Deep"
 "Rockin' All Around the World"
 "Who's Your Lady Friend?"
 "I'm Doggin' It"
 "Rainbow Connection"
 "Love in a Laundromat"
 "More, More, More"

Promotion
On May 4, 1990, Jim Henson appeared on The Arsenio Hall Show to promote the special with Kermit the Frog. Henson was joined by Kevin Clash, performing Clifford. It would be Henson's last live television appearance, and the last known time he performed Kermit the Frog.

Production notes
This was the last Muppet special Jim Henson worked on. It aired ten days prior to his death on May 16.

External links
 

1990 in American television
1990 television specials
1990s American television specials
Disney television specials
NBC television specials
The Muppets television specials
Walt Disney World in fiction
Television shows written by Jerry Juhl